The Star Engraving Company Building is a building at 3201 Allen Parkway in Houston, Texas, built in 1930 in the Spanish Colonial Revival style by the Star Engraving company to house its engraving factory. The building is currently owned by the city of Houston and serves as the Houston Center for the Arts, housing the Stages Repertory Theatre, the Houston Arts Alliance, and the Bayou Preservation Alliance.

Historical landmark

It was designated a local historic landmark in 1986, and was listed on the National Register of Historic Places in 1995.

Residents
The Stages Repertory Theatre has resided in the building since 1985, and the Children's Museum of Houston resided there until 1992. The building became the subject of controversy in 1992 when then-owner 3201 Allen Parkway Ltd. indicated its intent to evict the Stages Theatre and the Children's Museum in order to develop the building into loft condominia in partnership with developer Gross Investments. The Children's Museum had long been planning a move to the Museum District anyway, but Stages and its supporters protested that a move would greatly harm the theatre, and requested local-government assistance in buying the building. A few months later, the development deal with Gross Investments fell through, and 3201 Allen Parkway Ltd. offered to sell the building to Stages. However, Stages couldn't meet its asking price and negotiations broke down. The City of Houston eventually purchased the building, after a controversial threat to use eminent domain powers to confiscate it, and turned it into a municipal arts center. In 2020, the property was acquired by Houston-based real estate firm Radom Capital and remodeled into boutique offices, restaurant and retail space.

References

Industrial buildings completed in 1930
Manufacturing plants in the United States
National Register of Historic Places in Houston
Spanish Colonial Revival architecture in Texas
1930 establishments in Texas
Industrial buildings and structures on the National Register of Historic Places in Texas
Engraving